The Moyobamba Province is one of ten provinces of the San Martín Region in northern Peru.

Political division
The province is divided into six districts.

 Calzada (Calzada)
 Habana (Habana)
 Jepelacio (Jepelacio)
 Moyobamba (Moyobamba)
 Soritor (Soritor)
 Yantalo (Yantalo)

References

Provinces of the San Martín Region